The Soyuz-U launch vehicle was an improved version of the original Soyuz rocket. Soyuz-U was part of the R-7 family of rockets based on the R-7 Semyorka missile. Members of this rocket family were designed by the TsSKB design bureau and constructed at the Progress factory in Samara, Russia (now a united company, TsSKB-Progress). The first Soyuz-U flight took place on 18 May 1973, carrying as its payload Kosmos 559, a Zenit military surveillance satellite. The final flight of a Soyuz-U rocket took place on 22 February 2017, carrying Progress MS-05 to the International Space Station.

Soyuz-U was in use continuously for almost 44 years. Production of R-7 derived launch vehicles peaked in the late 1970s-early 1980s at 55–60 a year. Soyuz-U held the world record of highest launch rate in a year in 1979 with 47 flights until this was beaten by SpaceX's Falcon 9 in 2022. Over its operational lifetime, the Soyuz-U variant flew a total of 786 missions, another world record. The rocket had a streak of 112 consecutive successful launches between 11 July 1990 and 5 May 1996.

Development 
The earlier Soyuz 11A511 was the first attempt at creating a standardized R-7 core in place of the numerous variations that had been used up to 1966. Starting that year, the 11A511 Blok I and strap-on boosters were added to the Voskhod (11A57), Vostok-2 (8A92), and Molniya-M (8K78M) vehicles as well as minor R-7 variants flown once or twice for specialized payloads.

The uprated 11A511U core was introduced to the R-7 family in 1973, yielding the carrier rocket variant named Soyuz-U, although adoption across the board was not complete until 1977 when the existing stock of 11A511-derived boosters was used up.

Versions 
Two versions of Soyuz-U were fitted with an additional upper stage:
 Soyuz-U/Ikar with the Ikar third stage, produced by the Progress State Research and Production Rocket Space Center, TsSKB-Progress. The performance of the Ikar upper stage is lower than that of the Fregat upper stage, but it is more precise in maneuvering and it can operate autonomously longer. This version was launched 6 times in 1999, carrying four GlobalStar satellites on each mission.
 Soyuz-U/Fregat with the Fregat third stage, developed and produced by Lavochkin Association in Khimki. This version only flew 4 times in 2000; the Fregat upper stage was subsequently flown regularly atop Soyuz-FG and Soyuz-2 boosters.

An older variant of Soyuz-U, the Soyuz-U2 launcher, first flown in 1982, had the same hardware as the basic Soyuz-U. Instead of standard RP-1, it used a high energy, synthetic version, Syntin, as the first stage fuel.  This variant, mainly used to transport crew and cargo to the Mir space station, last flew in 1995, after production of Syntin ended due to cost reasons.

Soyuz-U was the basic platform for the development of the Soyuz-FG variant, which used an all-new first stage and took over crew transport to the ISS in 2002. Since 2013, both Soyuz-U and Soyuz-FG are gradually being replaced by the modernized Soyuz-2 launch vehicle.

Human spaceflight 
The first use of a Soyuz-U to launch a crewed mission took place 2 December 1974, when the Soyuz 16 crew was launched in preparation for the Apollo–Soyuz Test Project (ASTP). Soyuz 19, which as part of the ASTP docked with the last Apollo spacecraft ever flown, was also launched by a Soyuz-U rocket.

On 6 July 1976, a Soyuz-U launched Soyuz 21, which took a crew of two to the Salyut 5 space station. Many subsequent space station crews were launched on Soyuz-U launchers. The final crewed mission to use the Soyuz-U was Soyuz TM-34, a Soyuz ferry flight to the International Space Station.

A spectacular accident occurred on 26 September 1983, when the launcher for the Soyuz T-10a mission was destroyed by fire on the launch pad. The crew was saved by activation of the launch escape system a few seconds before the explosion.

Missions after 2000
From 2000 until its retirement in 2017, Soyuz-U vehicles were used by the Russian Federal Space Agency primarily to launch Progress-M robotic cargo spacecraft on resupply missions to the International Space Station (ISS).

Although the Soyuz-U was generally very reliable, occasional failures occurred, such as the October 2002 launch of a Foton satellite which crashed near the pad at Plesetsk after the Blok D strap-on booster suffered an engine malfunction. One person on the ground was killed.

A Soyuz-U mission failed to launch Progress M-12M to the ISS on 24 August 2011, when the upper stage experienced a problem and broke up over Siberia. It was the first time a Progress spacecraft had failed to reach orbit. Another cargo ship, Progress MS-04, was lost on 1 December 2016 shortly after launch, likely due to a problem with the third stage of the Soyuz-U.

In April 2015, Soyuz-U was declared obsolete. Its production was stopped and the rocket was scheduled for retirement after launching the remaining vehicles with Progress cargo ships. The final flight was Progress MS-05, which launched from the Baikonur Cosmodrome on 22 February 2017, 05:58:33 UTC.

References

External links

(PDF) Soyuz Launch Vehicle Users Manual
Astronautix.com entry on Soyuz-U / 11A511U
Astronautix.com entry on Soyuz-U2 / 11A511U2
Russian Federal Space Agency about Soyuz-U
Russian Federal Space Agency about Soyuz-U/Ikar
Russian Federal Space Agency about Soyuz-U/Fregat
Russian Federal Space Agency about Soyuz-U2
LV's manufacturer TsSKB-Progress about Soyuz-U (in Russian)

1973 in spaceflight
Soyuz program
Space launch vehicles of the Soviet Union
R-7 (rocket family)
Space launch vehicles of Russia
Vehicles introduced in 1973